Supplier diversity refers to the use of minority-owned businesses as suppliers, and a supplier diversity program is a proactive business program which encourages such use within an organisation's supply chain. Minority-owned includes black and minority ethnic business ownership, women owned, veteran owned, LGBT-owned , service disabled veteran owned, historically underutilized business, and Small Business Administration (SBA)-defined small business concerns. It is not directly correlated with supply chain diversification, although utilizing more vendors may enhance supply chain diversification. Supplier diversity programs recognize that sourcing products and services from previously under-used suppliers helps to sustain and progressively transform a company's supply chain, thus quantitatively reflecting the demographics of the community in which it operates by recording transactions with diverse suppliers.

United States
Paul D. Larson links the establishment of supplier diversity concerns to the American civil rights movement in the 1960s.

Diverse- and women-owned business enterprises are among the fastest-growing segments of the U.S. economy. Diverse-owned businesses generated an estimated $495 billion in annual revenue in 1997  and employed nearly 4 million workers, while women-owned firms employed about 19 million people  and generated $2.5 trillion in annual sales.

Alongside the Women-Owned Small Business Program, the US Small Business Administration also operates an Economically Disadvantaged Women Owned Small Business (EDWOSBs) program for preferential award of federal contracts in certain industries.

The Hackett Group, in their 2019 study of supplier diversity, found that US companies increasingly adopt supplier diversity programmes to achieve objectives associated with reputation management, their own corporate diversity culture and investment in their local communities, rather than reasons connected with legal compliance, and there are a growing number of companies who aim to extend supplier diversity within their tier 1 supply chain but also set expectations for tier 2 supply chain engagement activities to include supplier diversity language.

Public contract bidding
Certain states within the United States, as a part of their bidding process, incentivize Minority Business Enterprises (MBEs) and women-owned business enterprises (WBEs) to bid for publicly awarded construction or service contracts. They may also declare that a percentage of the work performed on a contract be awarded to an MBE or WBE.

In New York State, a goal was set in 2014 for the award of public contracts to women and minority businesses to increase from 20% in 2014 to 30% by 2019. When the target was increased, the Association of General Contractors (AGC) sued the state for failing to release documents via New York's Freedom of Information Law (FOIL). The AGC was concerned that the state had not conducted a proper contract analysis before declaring the increase of the MWBE goal to 30%. The AGC stated that the 30% goal did not reflect the availability of MWBEs statewide. The AGC also questioned a later study - performed by Mason Tillman Associates Ltd. of Oakland, California - which was paid for by the state in consideration of its employment goals for state contracts.

In 2018, the state was also considering establishing goals for the workforce of contractors awarded public contracts, but insisted these goals were not quotas. If contractors could not make a "good faith" effort to reach the goals, contractors might not be eligible for future public contracts for a length determined by the state.

There have been cases where contractors have been charged with crimes for impersonating MBEs. In New York in 2018, Eastern Building & Restoration was charged for fraudulently receiving over $1 million from public construction contracts by impersonating as an MBE during the years 2012 - 2014.

Canada
In Canada, supplier diversity is supported and facilitated by five councils:
Canadian Aboriginal and Minority Supplier Council
Canadian Council for Aboriginal Business
Canadian Gay and Lesbian Chamber of Commerce
Inclusive Workplace and Supply Council of Canada
Women Business Enterprises Canada Council
The Supplier Diversity Alliance Canada, formed in 2016, draws together the work of these councils (although the Canadian Council for Aboriginal Business is not directly involved in the alliance).

New Zealand
Supplier diversity initiatives in New Zealand are aimed in particular at engaging with Pasifika businesses.

See also
 Procurement outsourcing
 Procurement
 Strategic sourcing
 Supplier relationship management
 U.S. Women's Chamber of Commerce
 National LGBT Chamber of Commerce

References

Business terms
Procurement